Ichinose (written: 市瀬, 市ノ瀬, 一之瀬 or 一ノ瀬) is a Japanese surname. Notable people with the surname include:

, Japanese video game music composer
, Japanese voice actor
, Japanese voice actress
, Japanese war photographer

Fictional characters
, a character in the manga series Seiyu's Life!
, a character in the manga series Seraph of the End
, the protagonist of the anime series Gatchaman Crowds
, a character in the light novel and anime series Classroom of the Elite
, a character in the anime series Aikatsu!
, a character in the visual novel Clannad
, a character in the manga series Ore Monogatari
, a character in the visual novel series Uta no Prince-sama
, a character in the manga series Maison Ikkoku
, a character in the manga series Maison Ikkoku
, a character in the video game Persona 5 Strikers
, a character in the manga series Riddle Story of Devil

Japanese-language surnames